Flamboro Centre Aerodrome  is located adjacent to Flamborough, Ontario, Canada.

References

Registered aerodromes in Ontario